This is a list of taxa described by Charles Darwin. Many of them are barnacles from his study of that group.

 Balanus improvisus, bay barnacle
 Colorhamphus parvirostris, Patagonian tyrant
 Acasta cyathus, sponge barnacle
 Balanus nubilus, giant barnacle
 Balanus glandula, acorn barnacle
 Amphibalanus amphitrite, striped barnacle
 Elminius modestus, New Zealand barnacle
 Notomegabalanus decorus
 Megabalanus occator
 Lepas australis
 Tetraclita rubescens
 Coronula reginae
 Anelasma squalicola
 Heteralepas cornuta
 Tetraclita serrata
 Nobia conjugatum
 Rostratoverruca nexa
 Fistulobalanus pallidus
 Wanella milleporae
 Balanus trigonus
 Nesochthamalus intertextus
 Temnaspis fissum
 Balanus vestitus
 Balanus decorus
 Balanus (genus), barnacles
 Megabalanus stultus
 Octolasmis lowei
 Acasta fenestrata
 Balanus venustus
 Membranobalanus declivis
 Chthamalus fragilis
 Poecilasma kaempferi
 Megabalanus coccopoma, titan acorn barnacle
 Megabalanus decorus
 Megabalanus crispatus
 Acasta purpurata
 Euraphia intertexta
 Amphibalanus cirratus
 Euacasta sporillus
 Megabalanus vinaceus
 Megabalanus vesiculosus
 Epopella eosimplex
 Balanus poecilus
 Armatobalanus allium
 Centrostomum incisum (Platyhelminth)
 Savignium dentatum
 Coronula barbara
 Leptoplana notabilis
 Leptoplana formosa
 Pachylasma auranticacum

References

 01
Charles Darwin